Ordu–Giresun  Airport  is an airport on an artificial island just off the coast of  Gülyalı,  a town in Ordu Province, Turkey and Piraziz,  a town in Giresun Province, Turkey. It is the third artificial island airport in the world.

History
The idea for an airport on an artificial island for the two Black Sea provinces was first conceived in 1992. The construction work was started in 1994. However, due to high costs, the project came to a halt shortly afterward. The government took a  second airport project into consideration, and plans were worked out between 2008 and 2010. The project started on 13 July 2011. The opening of the airport for traffic took place on 22 May 2015. The airport is on reclaimed land from the sea in Gülyalı. About 30 million tons of rocks were used for the artificial island. It has a  runway, a  airport apron, a  taxiway, a  terminal building as well as  technical service and air traffic control building.

The airport's construction cost  290 million (US$128.5 million). It is expected to serve about 2 million passengers annually for the two provinces Ordu and Giresun, which have a total population of 1.2 million.

Airlines and destinations
The following airlines operate regular scheduled and charter flights at Ordu–Giresun Airport:

Traffic statistics

References

 

Airports in Turkey
Buildings and structures in Ordu Province
Artificial island airports
Airports established in 2015
2015 establishments in Turkey
Transport in Ordu Province